Hest may refer to:

 Ari Hest (born 1979), American singer-songwriter
 Greg van Hest (born 1973), Dutch runner
 Hest, an album by the Norwegian band Kakkmaddafakka

See also
 Hest Bank, a village in England